STS-135 (N-(adamantan-1-yl)-1-(5-fluoropentyl)-1H-indole-3-carboxamide, also called 5F-APICA) is a designer drug offered by online vendors as a cannabimimetic agent. The structure of STS-135 appears to use an understanding of structure-activity relationships within the indole class of cannabimimetics, although its design origins are unclear. STS-135 is the terminally-fluorinated analogue of SDB-001, just as AM-2201 is the terminally-fluorinated analogue of JWH-018, and XLR-11 is the terminally-fluorinated analogue of UR-144. STS-135 acts a potent cannabinoid receptor agonist in vitro, with an EC50 of 51 nM for human CB2 receptors, and 13 nM for human CB1 receptors. STS-135 produces bradycardia and hypothermia in rats at doses of 1–10 mg/kg, suggesting cannabinoid-like activity.

Legal status

As of October 2015 STS-135 is a controlled substance in China. It is also illegal in the UK.

Detection
A forensic standard of STS-135 is available, and the compound has been posted on the Forendex website of potential drugs of abuse.

See also 
 AB-001
 ADAMANTYL-THPINACA
 APICA
 APINACA
 AM-2201
 JWH-018
 UR-144
 XLR-11

References 

Adamantanes
Cannabinoids
Designer drugs
Organofluorides
Indoles
Indolecarboxamides